Melese erythrastis is a moth of the family Erebidae. It was described by Paul Dognin in 1907. It is found in French Guiana, Suriname and Guyana.

References

 

Melese
Moths described in 1907